Dame Allan's Schools is a collection of private day schools in Fenham, in the west end of Newcastle upon Tyne, England. It comprises a coeducational junior school, single-sex senior schools and a coeducational sixth form. Founded in 1705 as a charity, the original schools are two of the oldest schools in the city.

History

They were founded by Dame Eleanor Allan, the daughter of a local goldsmith and the widow of a tobacco merchant, to provide a proper education for "40 poor boys and 20 poor girls of the parishes of St Nicholas and St John". The schools were endowed with land at Wallsend, to the east of Newcastle. The original school seems likely to have been near St Nicholas's Church, and certainly was by 1778. It moved to Manor Chare near All Saints' Church in 1786, to Carliol Square in 1821, to Rosemary Lane off Pudding Chare in 1861, and to Hanover Square in 1875. The school then moved to College Street in Newcastle in 1883 and remained there until 1935 when it re-located to the present site in Fenham.

Until 1988 the schools operated as separate boys' and girls' schools with a joint governing body. The governors then took the decision to appoint a principal with overall responsibility for the management of the two schools.  At the same time, they created a joint mixed sixth form and reintroduced a mixed junior school. The plural, "schools", refers to the fact that Dame Allan's operates in a diamond format. In effect, Dame Allan's consists of 4 different schools: the co-educational Junior school for nursery to Year 6 are located in a separate building in Spital Tongues; the single sex boys' and girls' schools for years 7 to 11; and the co-educational sixth form (years 12 to 13).

Facilities
A number of new classrooms were built between 2004 and 2005 to replace older facilities, with some intended specifically for the sixth form centre. The Sixth Form Centre was opened by Queen Elizabeth II during an official visit on 14 October 2005 and was named the Queen's Building.

September 2012 saw the opening of the new nursery and junior school in Spital Tongues.

2015 saw Dame Allan's chosen as the recipient of a £250,000 grant to help fund a £500,000 project.  The grant was given by the Reece Foundation which promotes the improvement of education in engineering, technology and related subjects. The new facility will build on the Schools' existing master class programme.

Academics

All schools are private, and potential candidates must pass written exams and an interview. The fees are currently around £4,412 per term in the Main Schools and £4,312 per term in the Junior Department. These fees include books and external examination entry fees, but do not include meals (£3.72 per day). Scholarships of up to 50% are available on the basis of academic merit, and bursaries of up to 100% are available on the basis of academic merit and financial need.

Being a private school, Dame Allan's does not strictly adhere to the National Curriculum. It does enter all its students in public examinations such as GCSEs and A-levels, so the subjects taught are closely tied into their national counterparts. All students must study English, mathematics, and the sciences to GCSE level, and it is strongly recommended that at least one foreign language be studied to this level. Sixth form students have a much wider range of study, with no mandatory subjects and the introduction of many new subjects in year 12, including A-levels in politics, psychology, sports, business and theatre studies. Dame Allan's is an Anglican school.

In 2005 the school recorded its best ever set of exam results, including a handful of Top 5 results in several subjects, notably GCSE languages. Furthermore, two pupils were awarded 6 grade As at A-level. The school consistently performs to an extremely high standard in public examinations, with the girls' school often slightly outscoring the boys' school at GCSE level. The school has not yet been inspected by OFSTED but received a positive report from the independent schools Inspectorate in 2000.

The 2000 inspection summarised the schools as "a civilised and civilising community ...[which provides] a well-rounded education for pupils from the age of 8 to 18" and the 2006 report states "Dame Allan's are good schools with several great strengths and no significant weaknesses. The schools succeed very well in their key aims of providing a broad education for their pupils, where academic success is greatly valued but so is the moral, social and spiritual development of pupils."

Notable former pupils

Former pupils are known as Old Allanians.

The Right Reverend John Crook (born 1940), former Bishop of Moray, Ross and Caithness
Dame Myra Curtis (1886–1971), Principal of Newnham College, Cambridge
Margaret Dale (1922–2010), dancer and television producer
Professor Elizabeth Fallaize (1950–2009), Pro-Vice-Chancellor (Education), University of Oxford
Marian Foster (born 1948), broadcaster
Edward Hinds FRS (born 1949), Professor of Physics
Vick Hope (born 1989), TV and radio presenter
Ian La Frenais (born 1936), writer
David Leon (born 1980), actor
Sir David Lumsden (born 1928), Choirmaster, organist and harpsichordist; former Principal of the Royal Academy of Music
Philip Nicholson (born 1973), Northumberland cricketer
Sebastian Payne (born 1989), journalist
Peter Pilkington (1933–2011), Conservative Peer and former Chairman of the Broadcasting Complaints Commission
Varada Sethu (born 1992), actress
Keith Wrightson (born 1948), Randolph W. Townsend Professor of History, Yale University, since 2004.

References

External links
The findings of the most recent inspection of the Boys' Schools by the Independent Schools Inspectorate in 2006
The findings of the most recent inspection of the Girls' Schools by the Independent Schools Inspectorate in 2006
Official school website
A brief review of schools in the area mentioning Dame Allan's

Private schools in Newcastle upon Tyne
Educational institutions established in 1705
1705 establishments in England
Girls' schools in Tyne and Wear
Member schools of the Headmasters' and Headmistresses' Conference
Member schools of the Girls' Schools Association
Diamond schools